Ernie McAfee (1919–1956) was an early hot rodder who was a member of the 90 MPH club and the SCTA Road Runners club of Southern California. He was killed in a vehicular accident in 1956 in Pebble Beach.

Early Years of Racing

Mcafee's main claim to fame in the SoCal area was his 1938 136 mph Modified division record; this record was set in a Winfield-modified 4-cylinder flathead Ford. McAfee raced Modified Fords during the 1930s and was an innovator in streamlining. McAfee, along with fellow SCTA Road Runners Club member Jack Harvey, built and ran the first wheel enclosed Streamliner on Lake Muroc.

Career
McAfee was known after World War II for building and customizing cars through Ernie McAfee Engineering, McAfee during this time also campaigned Siatas, Crosleys, and his all-conquering baby blue 4.9-litre Ferrari. McAfee raced in the La Carrera Panamericana in 1953 as a driver of a Siata 208s, then as co-driver to Porfirio Rubirosa, who campaigned a Ferrari 500 Mondial in the 1954 race. He owned a Ferrari, Siata, Alfa Romeo, Moretti, and O.S.C.A. dealership on Sunset Boulevard in Los Angeles, California. He was killed during the 1956 running of the Del Monte trophy (Pebble Beach race), after colliding into a tree.

References 
 Christensen, Mark. (2005). SO-CAL Speed Shop: The Fast Tale of the California Racers Who Made  Hot Rod History.
 Tipler, Johnny. (2008). La Carrera Panamericana: "The World's Greatest Road Race!"
 Stone, Matt. McQueen, Chad. (2007). McQueen's Machines: The Cars and Bikes of a Hollywood Icon
 Drake, Albert B. (2008). The Age of Hot Rods: Essays on Rods, Custom Cars and Their Drivers from the 1950s to Today
 Carroll, William. (N/A). Muroc: When the Hot Rods Ran May 15, 1938

External links 
 http://crosleykook.blogspot.com/2010/02/random-photo-surprise.html
 http://jimturley.tripod.com/
 http://forums.autosport.com/index.php?showtopic=93766
 http://www.tamsoldracecarsite.net/TorreyPinesEMcAfee.html
 http://www.ussarcherfish.com/roadrunners/Alumni.htm

1919 births
1956 deaths
World Sportscar Championship drivers
Carrera Panamericana drivers
American racing drivers